Palencia railway station serves the Spanish city of Palencia, Castile and León. It is located on the Madrid–León high-speed rail line, and serves over 500,000 passengers a year.

Services
AVE high-speed rail services operate between Madrid-Chamartín and León calling at Palencia; Alvia trains to A Coruña, Gijón and Santander; and local regional services.

References

Railway stations in Castile and León